This Is Thirteen is the thirteenth studio album by Canadian heavy metal band Anvil.  The original release of This Is Thirteen has 13 tracks to coincide with the album title.  Some tracks are included in the movie Anvil! The Story of Anvil, which devotes some time to the recording of the album, specifically the song "Game Over".  In addition, "Burning Bridges" is heard in The Final Destination, but is not on the soundtrack to that film. This Is Thirteen sold over 1,400 copies in its first week of release in the United States, and by 2009 it had sold over 7,300 copies in the United States.

Track listing

Personnel
Anvil
Steve "Lips" Kudlow - vocals, lead guitar
Glenn Five - bass
Robb Reiner - drums

Additional musicians
Ivan Hurd - guitar solos on "Worry", "Burning Bridges" and "Room #9"

Production
Chris Tsangarides - producer, engineer, mixing

Charts

References

Anvil (band) albums
2007 albums
Albums produced by Chris Tsangarides